Joseph Anthony Smith (born September 5, 1936), also known as Jos. A. Smith, is an American artist who is best known for illustrating children's books. He has been a professional artist since 1961 and served as Professor of Fine Arts at the Pratt Institute in Brooklyn, New York, since 1962. 

Smith started his career as an editorial illustrator and cartoonist before shifting to children's book illustration. His work is held in permanent collections at the US National Portrait Gallery, Pennsylvania Academy of Fine Arts, and other museums and galleries. He participated in 20 solo exhibitions primarily at colleges and universities but also at Staten Island Museum, Huntington Museum of Art, and Samuel S. Fleisher Art Memorial. 

His papers are held at the University of Connecticut Library's Archives and Special Collections in the Thomas J. Dodd Research Center.

References

External links  

 Joseph A. Smith Papers - University of Connecticut Archives & Special Collections
 Faculty webpage - Pratt Institute
 
 

1936 births
Living people
People from Bellefonte, Pennsylvania
Pratt Institute alumni
Pratt Institute faculty
American illustrators
American children's book illustrators
20th-century American painters